is a Japanese adult visual novel developed by Ram that was released on July 25, 2008, for Windows as a DVD. 5 is the third game developed by Ram, and the first to be released after an eight-year hiatus since the first release of their last game, Koigokoro. The game bears the tagline, "Five little love tales which are likely to be buried in snow." The gameplay in 5 follows a linear plot line, which offers pre-determined scenarios and courses of interaction, and focuses on the appeal of the five female main characters.

Gameplay

5'''s gameplay requires little interaction from the player as most of the duration of the game is spent simply reading the text that appears on the screen which represents either dialogue between the various characters or the inner thoughts of the protagonist. Every so often, the player will come to a point where he or she is given the chance to choose from multiple options. The time between these points is variable and can occur anywhere from a minute to much longer. Gameplay pauses at these points and depending on which choice the player makes, the plot will progress in a specific direction. There are five main plot lines that the player will have the chance to experience, one for each of the heroines in the story. To view all five plot lines, the player will have to replay the game multiple times and make different decisions to progress the plot in an alternate direction. One of the goals of the gameplay is for the player to enable the viewing of hentai scenes depicting the protagonist, Takahiro, and one of the five heroines having sexual intercourse.

Plot and characters
Despite this, Kaede welcomes them to stay at her farm, where the main portion of the game's story takes place, and provides them with food and shelter. After two days at the farm, Takahiro rides Kaede's motorcycle to the town's shopping district and comes upon a lively, but clumsy girl named , who collided with Takahiro and injured her leg after running downhill. Due to this, Takahiro decides to take her home where he meets her older sister . Nene, unlike Honoka, is more reliable, intelligent, and takes care of the general domestic household chores.

Development
Originally titled , 5 is the third and last project developed by the visual novel studio Ram, and took about eight years to develop. Much of the staff for 5 did not work on Ram's previous two titles Negai and Koigokoro. Art direction and character design was headed by the artist Bang!, which was the artist's first work on a visual novel. Background art is headed by Torino. For work on the scenario, the author Kai returns as the only scenario writer for 5 that also worked on Ram's previous two titles. Hiroshi Yamaji and Kanrinin also worked on the scenario, despite the two having not been on the staff for many visual novels. The music in the game was composed primarily by Jun Maeda of Key, and VWN who also worked on the music for Negai and Koigokoro. Maeda stated that he composed about twenty background music tracks used in the game, and this was the first time he worked as the main composer on a game project. Both Kai and Torino have worked with Maeda in the past on previous Key titles.

Release history
On May 15, 2008, a free game demo of 5 became available for download at Ram's official website. In the demo, the player is introduced to the main characters in the game through a lengthy sequence that is typical of the gameplay found in a visual novel which includes times during gameplay where the player is given several choices to make in order to further the plot in a specific direction. It was followed by a second demo, released online on July 11, 2008, with edited scenario, and full voice acting with the exception of Takahiro. The full game was first released on July 25, 2008, after an eight-year hiatus since the original release of their previous game Koigokoro, as a DVD playable only on a Microsoft Windows PC.

Music
The visual novel has two main theme songs, the opening theme , and the ending theme , both sung by Haruka Shimotsuki. Both songs were written and composed by Jun Maeda of Key. Arrangement was handled by two artists, Takumaru for the opening theme, and Magome Togoshi for the ending theme, both of which have previously worked with Maeda on albums released by Key under their record label Key Sounds Label. A maxi single titled "Kaze no Kotowari" containing the two songs was included with the game as a pre-order extra. The game's original soundtrack entitled Yukar was released in a three CD set on July 24, 2009.

Reception and sales
Based on the sales on Getchu.com, 5 made its only appearance on its sales ranking at the nineteenth place out of thirty when it was first released in July 2008. According to a national ranking of bishōjo games based on sales in Japan, the limited edition of 5'' premiered at eighteenth place out of fifty.

References

External links
Ram's official 5 website 
 

2008 video games
Bishōjo games
Eroge
Japan-exclusive video games
Romance video games
Seinen manga
Video games developed in Japan
Video games scored by Jun Maeda
Visual novels
Windows games
Windows-only games